Geoff Parling (born 28 October 1983) is an English rugby union coach and former player. His usual playing position was lock.

Parling played for Newcastle Falcons, Leicester Tigers and Exeter Chiefs in Premiership Rugby, he won three English titles as a player, two with Leicester in 2010 and 2013 then again with Exeter in 2017.  He played in Japan for Munakata Sanix Blues and for Melbourne Rebels in Super Rugby.  

Since retiring from playing Parling has been a forwards coach, including for the  national team.

Playing career

Club level
Parling was born in Stockton-on-Tees, England. After attending Newcastle University, he began his club career at Newcastle Falcons. Parling became a first team regular in the 2005–06 season, winning the players' player of the year award. Parling captained Newcastle on several occasions during the 2006–07 season. He was the runner-up for the Gatorade Performance of the Guinness Premiership Season 2008–09.

Parling signed a contract to play for Leicester Tigers for the 2009/10 season.

Parling's debut for Leicester Tigers came against the club he had just left, and his first start for the club was in the Heineken Cup clash with Benetton Treviso. He also played in the Friendly match against , which the Tigers won 22–17.

Injuries to other Tigers players helped him to hold down a starting berth at lock, and the Tigers topped the table. They went on to win the 2009-10 Guinness Premiership final 33–27 against Saracens. Parling stole a vital line-out in the final minute of the game, which was right on the Tigers' try-line. He was voted Newcomer of the Year by Tigers supporters.

Parling won a second Premiership title in 2013, this time defeating Northampton Saints in the final.

On 29 January 2015, it was announced Parling had signed for Exeter Chiefs on a two-year deal. He started the final as Exeter Chiefs defeated Wasps to be crowned champions of the 2016-17 English Premiership.

International level

Parling represented England at Under 16s, Under 18s, Under 19s, and Under 21 level.

Parling was added to the revised England Saxons squad as cover for Nick Kennedy on 25 January 2010. He played in the wins against Ireland A and Italy A. Parling was selected in the 44-man  squad to tour Australia in June 2010, and played in the first game against the Australian Barbarians, though missed out on selection for the second as a result of a neck injury.

In January 2012, Parling was called up to the England senior squad in preparation for their Six Nations campaign as an injury replacement for Louis Deacon. He earned two caps off the bench before starting at lock against Wales, in a tightly-fought loss. His good performance (particularly at the line-out) saw him retained at lock for the following wins against France and Ireland, where he put in even better performances which saw him run the offensive and defensive line-outs well. He finished the tournament as the first-choice lock, ahead of Tom Palmer.

In April 2013, Parling was selected for the 2013 British & Irish Lions tour to Australia. He played in each Test, coming on as a replacement in the first Test and starting in the second and third.

International tries

Super Rugby statistics

Coaching career
After retirement from playing in 2018 Parling became lineout coach for the Melbourne Rebels.

In September 2020 Parling was appointed as 's forward coach in Dave Rennie's new coaching team.

References

External links

Geoff Parling profile at Leicester Tigers
Geoff Parling profile at the RFU

1983 births
Living people
Alumni of Newcastle University
British & Irish Lions rugby union players from England
England international rugby union players
English expatriate rugby union players
English rugby union players
Exeter Chiefs players
Expatriate rugby union players in Australia
Expatriate rugby union players in Japan
Leicester Tigers players
Melbourne Rebels coaches
Melbourne Rebels players
Munakata Sanix Blues players
Newcastle Falcons players
People educated at Durham School
Rugby union locks
Rugby union players from Stockton-on-Tees